Anatoly Trofimovich Serep (Chuvash & ; 1920–2003), was a Chuvash writer and poet.

Biography 
Serep was born 1920 in the village of Man Toktashin the Alikovsky Districtof the Chuvash Republic, Russia.

He was educated in Kalinino (modern day Tashir), and studied pedagogy. He worked as a school teacher in the village Varmankassy of the Shumerlinsky District.

In 1990, Serap became a member of the Union of the Writers of the Chuvash Republic.

He died in 2003 at Cheboksary.

Famous works 
 "Уйӑх юрри" (Moon song)
 "Асамат" (Asamat)
 "Аттесем ҫук чухне" (When Fathers Leave)

Literature 
 Efimov L. I., "Элӗк Енӗ" (Alikovo District), Alikovo, 1994.
 "Аликовская энциклопедия", editing: Efimov L. I., Efimov E. L., Anan'ev A. A., Terernt'ev G. K., Cheboksary, 2009, .
 "Чӑваш литературин антологийӗ", editing: Gordeev D. V., Silem J. A. Cheboksary, 2003.  .
 Гордеев, Д. Пултарулӑх асапне кӑна турӑ панӑ / Д. Гордеев // Хыпар. – 1998. – 28 юпа.
 Гордеев, Д. Фронтри тата ҫыру сӗтелӗ хушшинчи паттӑрлӑх / Д. Гордеев // Хыпар. – 2000. – 27 раштав.
 Тимофеев-Ыхра, А. Мӑн Тукташ Корчагинӗ / А. Тимофеев-Ыхра // Пурнӑҫ ҫулӗпе (Элӗк р-нӗ). – 2000. – 9 раштав.
 Чул хушшинчи чун // Пурнӑҫ ҫулӗпе (Элӗк р-нӗ). – 2000. – 31 çу.
 Ялгир, П. Афанасьев (Сереп) Анатолий Трофимович // Ялгир, П. Литературный мир Чувашии / П.
Ялгир. – Чебоксары, 2005. – С. 16.

Weblinks 
 Культурное наследие Чувашии

1920 births
2003 deaths
Chuvash-language poets
Chuvash writers
People from Alikovsky District
20th-century poets
Soviet writers
Soviet poets